Joseph Christopher Jones, known professionally as Jo D. Jonz, is an American actor, writer, director, and film producer.

Career

Early career
Jonz was born in New York City. His first acting role was in the play Medea, at the Borough of Manhattan Community College, at age nine.

Education
After he graduated from Humanities High School, Jonz performed in Off-Broadway productions of Shakespeare's Twelfth Night. Jonz relocated to Los Angeles and attended the American Academy of Dramatic Arts, later the University of Massachusetts Amherst, where he graduated with a double major in Theater and Anthropology. While he was there, he joined the Five College Theatre Arts program and toured Smith College, Hampshire College, Amherst College and Mt. Holyoke College.

Professional career
Shortly after, Jonz was cast in Charles S. Dutton's directorial debut film, First Time Felon. He also appeared in many television series including ER, NYPD Blue, Cold Case, and Criminal Minds. During this time he went on to write, direct, and star in the play Negritude.

Jonz produced a play, Jungle Kings, and appeared in the films Next Day Air and Midnight Son.

Filmography

References

External links 
 Official Website
 Jonz Unltd.
 
 15 Minutes of Fame Movie Website
 Oshune Body Care

Year of birth missing (living people)
Living people
Male actors from New York (state)
African-American film directors
African-American male actors
American male film actors
American film directors
American male television actors
University of Massachusetts Amherst College of Social and Behavioral Sciences alumni
21st-century African-American people